Ronald Oremland was an American microbiologist, astrobiologist, and emeritus senior scientist at the United States Geological Survey. He authored over 200 papers on the microbiology of extreme habitats.

Biography 
Oremland was raised in Brooklyn, New York. He received his B.S. in biology from Rensselaer Polytechnic Institute in 1968, where he was inspired by Hermann Ehrlich's geomicrobiology course to pursue a career in marine microbiology. He served as an active duty officer on the USS Utina (ATF-163) in the U.S. Navy. In 1976, he received a PhD from the University of Miami under the mentorship of Barrie F. Taylor, where he worked on methane cycling in tropical marine sediments. He went on to a postdoc at the NASA Ames Research Center, where he worked with Melvin P. Silverman on sulfate-reducing bacteria. He died of acute leukemia on September 16, 2021, at the age of 74.

Research 
From 1977 to 2019, Oremland conducted research at the United States Geological Survey in Menlo Park on the microbial metabolism in extreme environments including Mono Lake. His research focused on the geomicrobiology of acetylene, selenium, and arsenic.

Honors 
Oremland was an elected fellow of the American Society for Microbiology, American Geophysical Union, International Society for Environmental Biogeochemistry, and the American Association for the Advancement of Science. He was the 2020 recipient of the American Society of Microbiology Award for Environmental Research.

References 

American microbiologists
Astrobiologists
Living people
United States Geological Survey personnel
Scientists from Brooklyn
University of Miami alumni
Rensselaer Polytechnic Institute alumni
20th-century American biologists
United States Navy sailors
Fellows of the American Association for the Advancement of Science
21st-century American biologists
Fellows of the American Geophysical Union
1946 births